The Compagnie des chemins de fer de l'Ouest (CF de l'Ouest), often referred to simply as L'Ouest or Ouest, was an early French railway company which operated from the years 1855 through 1909.

History

Birth of the company 

The Compagnie de l'Ouest was created in 1855 by the merger of various small railway companies active in the western outskirts of Paris, in Normandy and in Brittany. These were:
Paris à Saint-Germain
Paris à Rouen
Rouen au Havre
Dieppe à Fécamp
Paris à Caen et à Cherbourg
the old Ouest (two lines from Paris to Versailles and Paris–Rennes)

Paris à Saint-Germain
The Ouest's oldest line (still open to this day) is the line from Paris to Le Pecq, built by Émile Péreire's Compagnie du chemin de fer de Paris à Saint-Germain and inaugurated on 24 August 1837 by Marie-Amélie, wife of King Louis-Philippe. Initially greeted with fear and lack of interest, the railway was a success that paved the way for other new railways, for instance to Rouen. In 1847, the line to Le Pecq was extended to Saint-Germain-en-Laye. The section between Saint-Germain-en-Laye and Nanterre – Université is now part of the RER line A. The section between Paris Saint-Lazare and Nanterre is part of the main lines to Rouen and Caen.

The old Ouest
While the line to Saint-Germain-en-Laye was being built, a line to Versailles, another popular Sunday destination, was projected. Two lines were built, one from Gare Saint-Lazare to the terminus Versailles-Rive-Droite, the other from Gare Montparnasse (Barrière du Maine) to the terminus Versailles-Rive-Gauche. James Mayer de Rothschild in conjunction with the Chemin de Fer de Versailles-rive-Droite, created in 1837, were given the concession to operate the lines. The line to Versailles-Rive-Gauche is also still in use today. The part between Montparnasse and Viroflay is used by trains from Paris to Chartres and Brittany as well as Transilien line N. The part between Viroflay and Versailles is used by RER C local trains.

Paris à Rouen

Two lines to Rouen in Normandy were projected: one passing through La Garenne-Colombes and following the left Seine bank from Poissy, the other passing through Pontoise and following the high plateaux on the right Seine bank. Due to the lack of confidence in the second project, the first one was granted and the concession given to Charles Laffitte and Edouard Blount. Construction began in 1841 under the orders of engineer Joseph Locke and with the help of British workers. Inauguration of the line was on 9 May 1843. It was an immediate success, so much so that issues with the Chemin de Fer de Saint-Germain with platform allocation at Gare Saint-Lazare occurred.

Expansion

The Imperial Government imposed the construction of several lines:
 Argentan – Granville
 Rennes – Brest
 Rennes – Saint-Malo
 Rennes – Redon
 Le Mans – Angers
 Serquigny – Rouen
 Lisieux – Honfleur
 Mézidon-Canon – Le Mans

The Government also imposed several secondary lines.

The network was rapidly expanded:

The line was declared of public utility in 1880 and the Chemins de fer de l'Ouest opened the line to l'Étang-la-Ville in 1884. Passenger services were extended to Saint-Germain Grande-Ceinture in 1889, services were then reported back to Saint-Nom-la-Bretèche in 1894 when passenger services on the Chemin de fer de Grande Ceinture were stopped.

A second line from Saint-Lazare to Mantes-la-Jolie was opened in 1892, following the right Seine bank. The new line started at Argenteuil, and passed Conflans-Sainte-Honorine, Triel and Meulan.

Because of the company's bad financial situation due to the region it served (agricultural for the most part), the law of 13 July 1908 saw the integration of the Companie des Chemins de fer de l'Ouest into the Chemins de fer de l'État on 1 January 1909.

Accidents 

 On a Sunday in May 1842, one of the worst accidents in French railway history happened near Meudon: 164 victims; the 55 dead were burnt alive (see Versailles train crash).  After this incident the company no longer locked doors on passenger coaches.
 Montparnasse derailment: On 22 October 1895 an express train originating from Granville traversed Montparnasse station, ploughed into the buffers, wrecked the station building's front wall and dropped to the ground on the street below.  The only fatality was the wife of a newspaper vendor, filling in for her husband (who had gone to get the evening newspapers), who was killed by falling masonry from the wall.
 In 1881 there were 2064 railway related accidents: 185 derailings, 190 collisions, 692 accidents on the line. 512 passengers died in these accidents, 1/10 of those who died in accidents on stagecoaches.
 Lists of rail accidents

Paris stations 

L'Ouest built several stations within Paris; the two main terminals St Lazare and Montparnasse as well as Pont Cardinet at the beginning of the line to Auteuil.

In 1851 the Ouest's Paris terminus, the Gare Saint-Lazare, was enlarged to comprise six groups for each main destination served:
 Group I & II: Versailles
 Group III: Auteuil
 Group IV: Argenteuil
 Group V: Saint-Germain-en-Laye
 Group VI: Rouen, Le Havre & Dieppe (the line to Caen served by this group was not opened until 1855)

La Ligne d'Auteuil

Line openings

Architecture

A sense of identity

As with many other railway companies, the Ouest adopted its own architectural style. Stations in large cities such as Le Havre, Lisieux, Deauville and Paris are unique. More modest halts were graced with 'type' building, which are called 'type Ouest', the best-preserved examples can be found in Dives-sur-Mer and Houlgate.
According to the size of the town or village close to the proposed site for the station, a station of a certain size was built. There are three generic types of station buildings; the BV3, BV5 and BV7. BV stands for Bâtiment Voyageur (station building) and the number, the number of doors accessible. The larger the town, the larger the station building.

As well as stations, infrastructure was also in mind when saving money so the Ouest created a level crossing guard house template (see below).

Station photos

Locomotives

Heilmann locomotives

In 1893,  built a steam-electric locomotive of Do Do wheel arrangement, which was trialled on the CF de l'Ouest. Named La Fusée Electrique, it was successful enough that two larger locomotives were constructed in 1897. These were numbered 8001 and 8002. Although considered successful, the design was not proceeded with and all three locomotives were dismantled.

References

Sources
  Histoire du réseau ferroviaire français, 1996, Editions de l'Ormet / Imprimerie Bayeusienne Graphique. 
  Le tour du Calvados en 80 cartes, 1996, Direction Départementale de l'Equipement (Calvados).
  Paris et l'Île de France – Tome 1: Les réseaux Est, Nord et Saint-Lazare, 2002, Le Train. ISSN 1267-5008
  Electrification des lignes Paris-Caen-Cherbourg et Paris-Trouville-Deauville, 1996, Conseil Régional de Basse Normandie (Rémy Desquesnes).

External links
 

Transport in Normandy
Railway companies of France
Railway companies established in 1855
1855 establishments in France
Railway companies disestablished in 1909
1909 mergers and acquisitions
1909 disestablishments in France